Han Hye-sook (born August 20, 1951) is a South Korean actress. Han won the Grand Prize in the controversial but highly rated television drama Dear Heaven at the SBS Drama Awards in 2006.

Filmography

Film

Television series

Awards and nominations

References

External links 
 
 
 
 

1951 births
Living people
South Korean television actresses
South Korean film actresses
Best Actress Paeksang Arts Award (television) winners